Treaty of Bangkok or Bangkok Treaty may refer to:

Burney Treaty (20 June 1826)
Siamese–American Treaty of Amity and Commerce (14 April 1836)
Bowring Treaty (18 April 1855)
Anglo-Siamese Treaty of 1909 (10 March)
Treaty between Thailand and Japan Concerning the Continuance of Friendly Relations and the Mutual Respect of Each Other's Territorial Integrity (23 December 1940)
Treaty of Amity and Economic Relations (Thailand–United States) (29 May 1966)
Treaty of Amity and Cooperation in Southeast Asia (24 February 1976)
Southeast Asian Nuclear-Weapon-Free Zone Treaty (15 December 1995)